This is a list of clubs that play Australian rules football in New South Wales at the senior level.
Guide to abbreviations: 
FC = Football Club
AFC = Australian Football Club (mainly used if in Queensland or NSW or outside Australia) / Amateur Football Club (mainly used in the other Australian States)
ARFC = Australian Rules Football Club

Australia

National Level

Australian Football League

State Level

AFL Canberra

Sydney AFL

Metropolitan / Country Level

Sydney AFL
Divisions 2,3 & 4
 Balmain Australian Football Club
 Camden Football Club
 Campbelltown Football Club
 Holroyd-Parramatta Football Club
 Macquarie University Football Club
 Manly-Warringah Football Club
 Moorebank Sports Football Club
 Nor-West Football Club
 Pennant Hills Football Club
 Penrith Football Club
 Southern Power Football Club
 Sydney Hills Eagles
 Sydney University Australian National Football Club
 UNSW-Eastern Suburbs Bulldogs
 UTS Australian Football Club

Black Diamond AFL

Cardiff Football Club
Gosford Football Club
Killarney Vale Football Club
Lake Macquarie Football Club (reserves only)
Maitland Football Club
Muswellbrook Football Club (reserves only)
Nelson Bay Football Club
Newcastle City Football Club
Port Stephens Football Club (women's only)
Singleton Football Club
Terrigal Avoca Football Club
The Entrance Bateau Bay Football Club (reserves only)
Wallsend-West Newcastle Football Club (reserves only)
Warners Bay Football Club
Wyong Lakes Football Club

Broken Hill Football League

Central Broken Hill Football Club
North Broken Hill Football Club
South Broken Hill Football Club
West Broken Hill Football Club

AFL Central West

Bathurst Bushrangers Football Club
Bathurst Giants Football Club
Cowra Blues Football Club
Dubbo Demons Football Club
Orange Tigers Football Club
Parkes Panthers Football Club

Farrer Football League

Ardlethan Ariah Park Mirrool Football Club
East Wagga Kooringal Football Club
Marrar Football Club
North Wagga Football Club
Temora Football Club
The Rock-Yerong Creek Football Club
Barellan Football Club
Colleambally Football Club
CSU Bushpigs Football Club

Golden Rivers Football League

Hay Football Club
Moulamein Football Club

Hume Football League

Billabong Crows Football Club
Brock/Burrum Saints Football Club
CDHBU Football Club
Culcairn Football Club
Henty Football Club
Holbrook Football Club
Howlong Football Club
Jindera Football Club
Lockhart Football Club
Murray Magpies Football Club
Rand Walbundrie Walla Walla Football Club

AFL North Coast
Byron Magpies Football Club
Coffs Harbour Breakers Football Club
Grafton Football Club
Lismore Football Club
Nambucca Valley Football Club
Northern Beaches Football Club
Port Macquarie Football Club
Sawtell Toormina Football Club

AFL North West

Gunnedah District Bulldogs Football Club
Inverell Saints Football Club
Moree Suns Football Club/Narrabri Eagles Football Club
New England Nomads Football Club
Tamworth Kangaroos Football Club
Tamworth Swans Football Club

Northern Riverina Football League

Hillston Football Club
Lake Cargelligo Football Club
Tullibigeal Football Club
Ungarie Football Club
West Wyalong/Girral Football Club

QFA 
Ballina Bombers Football Club
Tweed Coast Tigers Football Club

Riverina Football League

Coolamon Football Club
Collingullie Glenfield Park Football Club
Ganmain Grong Grong Matong Football Club
Griffith Football Club
Leeton/Whitton Football Club
Mangoplah Cookadinia United Eastlakes Football Club
Narrandera Football Club
Turvey Park Football Club
Wagga Tigers Football Club

Sapphire Coast AFL

Batemans Bay Football Club
Bermagui Football Club
Diggers Football Club
Eden Football Club
Narooma Football Club
Pambula Football Club
Tathra Football Club

South Coast AFL

Bomaderry Football Club
Figtree Football Club
Kiama Football Club
Northern Districts Football Club
Nowra Albatross Football Club 
Port Kembla Football Club
Shellharbour City Football Club
Ulladulla Football Club
Wollongong Bulldogs Football Club
Wollongong Lions Football Club

Australia clubs